Gautrat is a surname. Notable people with the surname include:

Annie Gautrat (born 1947), better known as Stone, French singer and actor
Fabrice Gautrat (born 1987), American soccer player and coach
Morgan Gautrat (born 1993), American soccer player